Blerimas may refer the following places in Albania:
Blerimas, Elbasan
Blerimas, Vlorë